Delmonico International Corporation was one of several subsidiaries of Elgin National Industries.  Additional divisions included Elgin National Watch Company (and other watch companies), Elgin Radio, Newport Yachts (sailboats), Enterprise Yachts (which includes Breuil powerboats), and others.  Delmonico's three primary businesses were: the importing of Ignis freezers and refrigerators (part of the Agnelli empire of Fiat fame); the manufacturing of home entertainment equipment, such as stereos and televisions (including console stereos and television sets in the Early American, Mediterranean, French Provincial, and Scandinavian styles) in a large manufacturing facility in Queens, New York; and being the first importers into the United States of both Sony (in 1959) and JVC (in the 1960s).  Many Delmonico products included the Nivico (Nippon Victor Corporation) brand as well. During this time, JVC was a pioneer in quadraphonic sound (a precursor to 5.1) and multi-frequency tone control (JVC called it SEA, for special effects amplifier). In 1969, Delmonico's revenue was $65,000,000 and Raymond Gincavage was the president.

Electronics companies of the United States
Defunct companies based in New York (state)